Jazz Impressions of Folk Music is an album recorded by American saxophonist Harold Land in 1963 for the Imperial label.

Reception

AllMusic awarded the album 4 stars stating "Released at the commercial apex of the folk revival, Jazz Impressions of Folk Music far transcends its cash-grab origins. Harold Land reinvents traditional favorites...  And although Land's name sits above the title, Jazz Impressions of Folk Music is first and foremost a showcase for Jones, who turns in some of the most imaginative and vibrant work of his career".

Track listing
All compositions by Traditional except as indicated
 "Tom Dooley" - 6:56  
 "Scarlet Ribbons (Evelyn Danzig, Jack Segal) - 4:07  
 "Foggy, Foggy Dew" - 4:19   
 "Kisses Sweeter than Wine" - 3:52  
 "On Top of Old Smokey" - 2:57 
 "Take This Hammer" - 6:45  
 "Blue Tail Fly" - 3:45  
 "Hava Nagila" - 5:13

Personnel 
Harold Land - tenor saxophone
Carmell Jones - trumpet
John Houston - piano
Jimmy Bond - bass
Mel Lee - drums

References 

 

1963 albums
Harold Land albums
Imperial Records albums